François Bott (26 June 1935 – 22 September 2022) was a French author who after a long career as a journalist and literary critic became a writer of novels, one of which, Une minute d’absence (2001), won the Académie Française's Prix de la Nouvelle. He continued as a literary critic, writing essays focused on other writers, especially Roger Vailland.

Biography 
After earning his Licence in philosophy, Bott began as a journalist at France-Soir. He then directed the literary pages of L'Express and founded  Le Magazine Littéraire in 1967. The following year he joined the newspaper Le Monde, where he directed Le Monde des livres from 1983 to 1991, replacing . In 1995, he decided to leave journalism to devote himself to writing books.

Bott authored some thirty books, including novels and literary essays, such as La Demoiselle des Lumières and Sur la planète des sentiments, works on writers and exceptional women. His  retells the story of the Vélodrome d'hiver, from a cycling track to a place of repression and torture during World War II. Bott was awarded the Académie Française's Prix de la Nouvelle in 2001 for Une minute d’absence.

Bott's last novel, Nos années éperdues  (2015), was praised in the magazine Causeur for its portrayal of life in France in the 1950s, and particularly for the rendering of the correspondence between the two main characters.

In particular, he published a reference book on Vailland: .

Bott was a regular contributor to the literary magazine Service littéraire. He died in Paris at the age of 87 on 22 September 2022.

Main works

Novels and essays 
The books by Bott are held by the French National Library:
1969: , éditions Grasset
1986: Lettres à Baudelaire, Chandler et quelques autres, éditions Albin Michel, 146 pages 
1998: Sur la planète des sentiments, portraits littéraires d'Emmanuel Berl à Stefan Zweig, Collection Amor Fati, Cherche Midi, 
2002: Dieu prenait-il du café ?, portraits littéraires du XIX, Collection Amor Fati, Cherche Midi 
2007: Femmes de plaisirs, Cherche Midi 
2003: Femmes extrêmes, Cherche Midi ,
2005: Faut-il rentrer de Montevideo ?, sur les traces de Lautréamont, collection Romans, août 2005, Éditions du Cherche Midi, 
2008: , Édition du Cherche Midi, 2008, 
2003: Radiguet : L'Enfant avec une canne, Éditions Gallimard, collection Folio, 220 pages, 
1997: La Demoiselle des lumières, Éditeur Gallimard, collection Un et l'Autre, 
1996: Le Cousin de la marquise, Éditeur Le Monde Éditions, collection Monde Éditions, 
1988: Éloge de l'égotisme, Éditeur Éditions de l'Instant, collection : Griffures, 
2001: Une minute d'absence, Éditeur Gallimard, Collection Blanche, 131 pages, 
2006: Le Genre féminin, Éditions des Équateurs
2004: L'Éclat de rire de la jeunesse
2008! Gina, Éditions de La Table Ronde, collection La petite Vermillon, 193 pages, 
2010: Écrivains en robe de chambre, Éditions de La Table Ronde, collection La petite Vermillon, 280 pages, 
2010: La Traversée des jours : Souvenirs de la République des Lettres (1958-2008), Éditions du Cherche Midi, 169 pages. 
2014: Le Dernier Tango de Kees Van Dongen, Éditions du Cherche Midi, 144 pages

Works written in collaboration 
 Boulevard de l'océan par François de Cornière, preface by François Bott, Édition Le Castor Astral, collection Poche, May 2006
 Enquête poésie auprès de 250 revues littéraires, Édition Jean-Michel Place, collection Enquête,  par Jean-Michel Place, François Bott, Jacques Lepage, et Michel Carassou, 1979
 Le Discours du chameau, suivi de Jenine et autres poèmes par Tahar Ben Jelloun et François Bott, Éditions Gallimard Poche, collection Poésie, March 2007, 543 pages, 
 Les Séductions de l'existence, François Bott, Dominique Grisoni, Yves Simon, Roland Jaccard,  LGF/Livre de poche, collection Biblio Essais, December 1989

Further reading 
 François Bott, Un aficionado de la vie, Interviews, Roger Vailland, éditions Subervie, 1970

References

External links 
 François Bott (in French) gallimard.fr
 François Bott (in French) franceculture.fr
 François Bott (in French) BNF
 Josyane Savigneau: François Bott, éternel promeneur (in French) Le Monde des livres 6 October 2005
 James M. Markham: Arab Novelist Falls in Love With French The New York Times 25 November 1987

1935 births
2022 deaths
20th-century French male writers
21st-century French journalists
Prix Valery Larbaud winners
21st-century French novelists
20th-century French essayists
21st-century French essayists
Historians of Paris
French essayists
21st-century French male writers
French male non-fiction writers
People from Laon